Valley Center USD 262 is a public unified school district headquartered in Valley Center, Kansas, United States.  The district includes the communities of Valley Center, Park City, Sunnydale, and nearby rural areas.

Schools
The school district operates the following schools:
 Valley Center High School
 Valley Center Middle School
 Valley Center Intermediate School
 Abilene Elementary School
 West Elementary School
 Wheatland Elementary School
 Valley Center Learning Center

Notable people
 Mary Easley - Oklahoma Senator (2004-2010), Oklahoma Representative (1997-2004), teacher

See also
 Kansas State Department of Education
 Kansas State High School Activities Association
 List of high schools in Kansas
 List of unified school districts in Kansas

References

External links
 

School districts in Kansas
Education in Sedgwick County, Kansas